Shadow play refers to shadow puppetry or shadow theatre.

Shadowplay, Shadow Play or The Shadow Play may refer to:

Literature
Shadowplay (novel), 2007 novel by Tad Williams
Shadowplay, 1990 novel by Jo Clayton
Shadowplay, 1993 novel by Nigel Findley
Shadowplay, 2005 graphic novel series by Ashley Wood, Ben Templesmith, Christina Z
Shadowplay, 2010 novel by Karen Campbell
Shadowplay, 2014 novel by Laura Lam
Shadowplay, 2019 novel by Joseph O'Connor
Shadow Play (play), 1935 play by Noël Coward
Shadow Play, 1993 novel by Charles Baxter
"Shadow Play" (Look and Read) (2004), the last story of Look and Read

Film
Shadow Play (film), a 1986 TV movie
The Shadow Play (1992 film), a Turkish film directed by Yavuz Turgul
The Shadow Play (2018 film), Chinese film directed by Lou Ye
Shadowplay (2022 film), a 2022 Czech film directed by Peter Bebjak

Television
"Shadow Play", an episode of Doctor Who Confidential that accompanies "Silence in the Library"
"Shadow Play" (Stargate SG-1), an episode of the television series Stargate SG-1
"Shadow Play" (The Twilight Zone, 1959), an episode of The Twilight Zone starring Dennis Weaver
"Shadow Play" (The Twilight Zone, 1985), an episode of The Twilight Zone and a remake of the 1961 episode
, also released as The Defeated (2020), a TV series about the aftermath of World War II
"Shadowplay" (Star Trek: Deep Space Nine), an episode of Star Trek: Deep Space Nine

Other uses
Shadow Play (horse), world record-holding Standardbred racehorse
Nvidia Shadowplay, hardware accelerated screen recording by Nvidia
ShadowPlay, the first WiiWare game to use Wii MotionPlus
"Shadowplay" (song), a song originally by Joy Division
"Shadow Play", a song by Rory Gallagher from the album Photo-Finish

See also
Shadowplayers, title of both a 2006 documentary film and a 2010 book by James Nice
Shadow Plays, an album by Craig Taborn